"Choiceless choices" is a term coined by Lawrence Langer to describe the no-win situations faced by Jews during the Holocaust.

References

Holocaust terminology